Jasmina Mihajlović (born in Niš, 1960) is a Serbian writer and literary critic. She is also chairwoman of Bequest of Milorad Pavić, famous Serbian writer and her late spouse.

Biography

Mihajlović graduated from the Faculty of Philology in Belgrade - group of Yugoslav and World literature (1987). In the beginning of the career she has taught literature in secondary schools in Belgrade.

She worked on the „Serbian Literary Criticism“ project in the Belgrade Institute of Literature and Art (1989-1991). After that, she was Director of the Council for promoting Serbian culture abroad, with the World Serbian Community seated in Geneva (1991-1999). She is freelance artist since then.

Her prose, essays and studies have been translated into English, Russian, Slovenian, Ukrainian and Greek. She writes columns for Serbian magazines Lisa, Grad, Jasmin, Fame, Bazar and Ona.

She is member of the Serbian Literary Society.

Books
 Tale of the Body and Soul. Layers and Meanings in the Prose of Milorad Pavić , "Prosveta", Belgrade, 1992.
 Two tales from Kotor with Milorad Pavić, "Dereta", Belgrade, 1998, 2005.
 Private collection, "Dereta", Belgrade, 2000, 2001, 2004, 2005.
 Travel album, "Dereta", Belgrade, 2004, 2005, 2006.
 Love Story in Two Tales with Milorad Pavić, "Čigoja", Belgrade, 2004.
 Love without secrets, "Dereta", Belgrade, 2005.
 Love with a vocabulary of the unknown, "Ljubitelji knjige", Novi Sad, 2006, 2007.
 Paris Kiss, "Ljubitelji knjige", Novi Sad, 2007; "Parizhskiy potseluy", "Azbuka", Sankt Petersburg, 2007; Zavod za udžbenike, Belgrade, 2010; Amazon, e-book, 2011.
 Travel Collection. The choice of stories, "Alnari", Belgrade, 2008.
 On the Shores of the Khazar Sea, Amazon.com, Kindle Store, 2014.
 Boring Book. Miscellany, "Dereta", Belgrade, 2019.

Anthologies

 An anthology of stories by Serbian women writers, ed. by Rajko Lukač, "Zepter Book World", Belgrade, 2002.
 The Bite of Passion: Stories of Erotic fantasy , edited by Pavle Zelić, Society of Sci-Fi and Fantasy fans "Lazar Komarčić", Belgrade, 2007.

Awards

"Dereta's Book of the Year", 2004, for Travel album

External links 
 Official homepage 
 An excerpt from Paris Kiss, Official site 
 An excerpt from Private collection, Biblioteke.org (Serbian)
 Tale of the Body and Soul. Layers and Meanings in the Prose of Milorad Pavić, "Prosveta", Belgrade, 1992. Complete e-edition, Project Rastko, 2005. (Serbian)

1960 births
Writers from Niš
University of Belgrade Faculty of Philology alumni
Serbian novelists
Serbian non-fiction writers
Serbian literary critics
Women literary critics
Literary critics of Serbian
Postmodern writers
Living people
Serbian women novelists